Çarşamba is a town and district (ilçe) of Samsun Province in the Black Sea region of Turkey, in the center of the Çarşamba Plain. It is the second largest district of the Samsun province after Bafra. The mayor is Halit Doğan (AKP). Ferhan Şensoy - writer, actor and stage director - was born here.

The town is bisected by the Yeşilırmak river running south-to-north and by the Black Sea Coastal Road (D010) which runs west-to-east. There is a Sugar Factory in Çarşamba county.

See also
Göğceli Mosque, Seljuk Empire era log mosque in Göğceli Cemetery

References

External links
 Çarşamba municipality's official website

 
Populated places in Samsun Province
Towns in Turkey